Henri Tiedge is an American neurologist, and  a SUNY Distinguished Professor at SUNY Downstate Medical Center, State University of New York.

References

Year of birth missing (living people)
Living people
State University of New York faculty
American neurologists